Alain Ferté (born 8 October 1955 in Falaise, Calvados) is a French professional racing driver. He is the elder brother of Michel Ferté, who was also a professional racing driver.

Alain Ferté competed five seasons in Formula 3000 1985–1989. He won the 1979 French Formula Renault Championship and the 1980 French F3 championship.

He has also competed in GT racing for many years, driving cars such as the Porsche 911 GT1, Toyota MR2-based SARD MC8R, and Maserati MC12 GT1.

Racing record

Complete European Formula Two Championship results
(key)

Complete International Formula 3000 results
(key)

24 Hours of Le Mans results

Complete JGTC results
(key) (Races in bold indicate pole position) (Races in italics indicate fastest lap)

References

External links 

1955 births
Living people
People from Falaise, Calvados
French racing drivers
Deutsche Tourenwagen Masters drivers
European Formula Two Championship drivers
French Formula Renault 2.0 drivers
French Formula Three Championship drivers
International Formula 3000 drivers
24 Hours of Le Mans drivers
European Le Mans Series drivers
World Sportscar Championship drivers
Blancpain Endurance Series drivers
24 Hours of Spa drivers
Sportspeople from Calvados (department)
24H Series drivers
Peugeot Sport drivers
Oreca drivers
Mercedes-AMG Motorsport drivers
Jaguar Racing drivers
ART Grand Prix drivers
Graff Racing drivers
Team LeMans drivers
W Racing Team drivers
British GT Championship drivers
Sauber Motorsport drivers
GT4 European Series drivers